William Keith Wright (born January 30, 1956 in Mercedes, Texas) is a former American football wide receiver and return specialist in the National Football League. He was drafted by the Cleveland Browns in the fifth round of the 1978 NFL Draft. He played college football at The University of Memphis.

External links
 

1956 births
Living people
American football wide receivers
Memphis Tigers football players
Cleveland Browns players